Red clover is a species of clover native to Europe, Western Asia, and northwest Africa. 

Red clover may also refer to:

Red clover vein mosaic virus, a plant pathogenic virus.
Red clover necrotic mosaic virus translation enhancer elements
Red Clover Creek, a stream in Plumas County, California
Red clover diseases, a list of diseases that affect red clover
Red Clover (film), a 2012 horror film starring Billy Zane